The superior labial branches (labial branches), the largest and most numerous, descend behind the quadratus labii superioris, and are distributed to the skin of the upper lip, the mucous membrane of the mouth, and labial glands.

They are joined, immediately beneath the orbit, by filaments from the facial nerve, forming with them the infraorbital plexus.

See also
 Superior labial artery

External links

Maxillary nerve